Lucien Seevagen (29 January 1887 – 25 June 1959) was a French painter. His work was part of the painting event in the art competition at the 1924 Summer Olympics.

References

1887 births
1959 deaths
19th-century French painters
20th-century French painters
20th-century French male artists
French male painters
Olympic competitors in art competitions
People from Chaumont, Haute-Marne
19th-century French male artists